This is a list of plants found in the wild in Pantanal vegetation of Brazil.

Aizoaceae
 Glinus radiatus Rohrb.

Amaranthaceae
 Achyranthes aspera L.
 Amaranthus lividus ssp. polygonoides L.
 Froelichia procera (Seub.) Pedersen
 Gomphrena elegans var elegans Mart. 
 Iresine macrophylla R.E.Fr.
 Pfaffia glomerata (Spreng.) Pedersen

Amaryllidaceae
 Alstroemeria cf. psittacina Lehm.
 Hippeastrum belladonna L.

Anacardiaceae
 Anacardium humile A.St.-Hil.
 Astronium fraxinifolium Schott
 Myracrodruon urundeuva M.Allemão
 Schinopsis balansae Engl.
 Spondias lutea L.

Annonaceae
 Annona coriacea Mart.
 Annona cornifolia A.St.-Hil.
 Annona dioica A.St.-Hil.
 Annona phaeoclados Mart.
 Duguetia furfuracea (A.St.-Hil.) Benth. et Hook.f. 
 Rollinia emarginata Schltdl.  
 Unonopsis lindmanii R.E.Fr.
 Xylopia aromatica Mart.

Apocynaceae 
 Aspidosperma parvifolium A.DC.
 Aspidosperma cylindrocarpon Müll.Arg.
 Aspidosperma quebracho-blanco Schicht.
 Aspidosperma tomentosum Mart.
 Bonafousia siphilitica (L.f.) L.Allorge 
 Forsteronia pubescens A.DC.  
 Hancornia speciosa Gomes
 Himatanthus obovatus (Müll.Arg.) Woodson
 Macrosiphonia petraea Kuntze  
 Prestonia coalita (Vell.) Woodson  
 Rhabdadenia pohlii Müll.Arg.  
 Rhodocalyx rotundifolius Müll.Arg.  
 Secondatia densiflora A.DC.  
 Thevetia bicornuta Müll.Arg.

Bignoniaceae
 Tabebuia roseo-alba (Ridl.) Sandwith
 Tabebuia ochracea (Cham.) Standl.
 Handroanthus heptaphyllus

Clusiaceae
 Kielmeyera coriacea Mart. & Zucc.

See also
 List of plants of Amazon Rainforest vegetation of Brazil
 List of plants of Atlantic Forest vegetation of Brazil
 List of plants of Caatinga vegetation of Brazil
 List of plants of Cerrado vegetation of Brazil
 Official list of endangered flora of Brazil

References
  Lorenzi, Harri (1992) Árvores Brasileiras (Brazilian Trees) Nova Odessa: Plantarum.
  POTT, A. POTT, V.J. (1994) Plantas do Pantanal. (Plants of Pantanal) EMBRAPA  p.

Pantanal
Environment of Mato Grosso
Environment of Mato Grosso do Sul
Pantanal